Corey Mayfield is a former American football offensive lineman/defensive lineman and coach of the Arena Football League. Mayfield is currently the Defensive Coordinator of the Texas Revolution of Champions Indoor Football (CIF). Mayfield played in the National Football League and the Arena Football League.

College years
Mayfield graduated from the University of Oklahoma with a Bachelor of Arts degree and was a three-year starter. He finished his career with 12 sacks and 88 tackles.

Professional career
Mayfield played for the San Francisco 49ers, Tampa Bay Buccaneers, Jacksonville Jaguars, Grand Rapids Rampage, Orlando Rage, Philadelphia Soul and the Dallas Desperados.

Coaching career
Corey Mayfield  began his coaching career as an assistant with the Dallas Desperados. He served as the Defensive Line Coach/Co-Special Teams Coordinator for the New York Dragons and Head Coach of the East Texas Wranglers of the Independent Indoor Football Alliance

References

External links
AFL stats
San Jose SaberCats profile

1970 births
Living people
Sportspeople from Tyler, Texas
American football offensive linemen
American football defensive linemen
Oklahoma Sooners football players
Tampa Bay Buccaneers players
Jacksonville Jaguars players
Grand Rapids Rampage players
Philadelphia Soul players
Dallas Desperados players
San Jose SaberCats coaches
San Antonio Talons coaches
New York Dragons coaches
Texas Revolution coaches